Educating is a British documentary reality television programme which first aired on 22 September 2011. It has run for four series. The show took a year break before announcing the fifth series which aired in 2017 on Channel 4. It uses a fly on the wall format to show the everyday lives of the staff and pupils of secondary schools all over the UK. It shows an insight to the realities of a British secondary school.

Series overview

Episodes

Series 1: Essex (2011)

Series 2: Yorkshire (2013–14)

Series 3: The East End (2014)

Series 4: Cardiff (2015)

Series 5: Greater Manchester (2017)

Series 6: Greater Manchester 2 (2020)

Educating: What I Wish I'd Known...

References

Channel 4 documentary series
Lists of British non-fiction television series episodes